The Hewins Park Pavilion, at 101 Salebarn Rd. in Cedar Vale, Kansas, was built in 1913.  It was listed on the National Register of Historic Places in 2007.

It is a wood-frame gabled amphitheater which is open on three sides.  Its roof is supported by six evenly spaced radial arch wooden beams.  It has a concrete floor and a semicircular stage.

References

Event venues on the National Register of Historic Places in Kansas
Buildings and structures completed in 1913
Chautauqua County, Kansas
1913 establishments in Kansas
Amphitheaters on the National Register of Historic Places